Towosahgy State Historic Site (23MI2), also known as Beckwith's Fort Archeological Site, is a large Mississippian archaeological site with a Woodland period Baytown culture component located in Mississippi County, Missouri, United States. It is believed to have been inhabited from c. 400–1350 CE. The site is maintained by the Missouri Department of Natural Resources as a state historic site. The name Towosahgy is an Osage word which means "old town". It is not known if members of the historic Osage people, who dominated a large area of present-day Missouri at the beginning of the 19th century, ever occupied the site. The site was acquired by the Missouri state park system in 1967 and added to the National Register of Historic Places in 1969 as NRIS number 69000113.

History of Towosahgy 
The earliest portion of Towosahgy State Historic Site is in the southern half, where a Late Woodland period village once stood. Wilkie dates this component to about 400 to 700 CE.

Later the site was fortified and built up as a Mississippian village with seven platform mounds, most surrounding a central plaza area. During this time, the site was surrounded by a palisade wall of vertical logs and a moat. Like other Mississippian mound centers, Towosahgy also had a borrow pit from which earth was removed to create the mounds. The largest remaining mound in the complex is Mound 2, also known as the "temple mound". Excavations on this part of the site were conducted in 1989 by James Price. The site was abandoned during the late 14th century for unknown reasons, as were many similar Mississippian sites in the region.

Ceramics from the site represent typical pottery found in the Missouri Bootheel region. Sherds from the Woodland occupation are typically grog tempered. The later Mississippian culture pottery is shell tempered. Type varieties identified include Baytown Plain and Mulberry Creek Cordmarked. Mississippian ceramics were also both plain and decorated. Punctuated, incised, fabric impressed, and red, black, and brown painted/slipped sherds, typical decorating methods, are all present. A large collection of ceramic vessels from the site are part of the Beckwith Collection displayed at the Rosemary Berkel and Harry L. Crisp II Museum at Southeast Missouri State University.

See also
 Kincaid Mounds
 Ware Mounds
 Wickliffe Mounds

References

External links

Towosahgy State Historic Site Missouri Department of Natural Resources
Towosahgy State Historic Site Map Missouri Department of Natural Resources
Beckwith Collection. Rosemary Berkel and Harry L. Crisp II Museum, Southeast Missouri State University
The Wilkie Collection, Southeast Missouri State University Special Collections and Archive

Middle Mississippian culture
Mounds in Missouri
Native American history of Missouri
Archaeological sites in Missouri
Missouri State Historic Sites
Archaeological sites on the National Register of Historic Places in Missouri
Buildings and structures in Mississippi County, Missouri
Protected areas established in 1967
Protected areas of Mississippi County, Missouri
1967 establishments in Missouri